The Indian Super League is an Indian professional league for association football. At the top of the Indian football league system, it is the country's primary football competition and is contested by 11 clubs. This page details the records and statistics of the league since its first season in 2014.

Team records

Titles 
Most Championship titles: 3, ATK
Most Premiership titles: 2, Mumbai City
Biggest league winning margin: 5 points
2019–20; Goa (39 points) over ATK (34 points)
2021–22; Jamshedpur (43 points) over Hyderabad (38 points)
Smallest league winning margin: 0 points, 6 head-to-head points, 2020–21; Mumbai City (6) over ATK Mohun Bagan (0). Both finished on 40 points, but Mumbai City won the title on head-to-head points.

Points 
Most points in a season: 46, Mumbai City (2022–23)
Most home points in a season: 25, ATK Mohun Bagan (2020–21)  
Most away points in a season: 25, Mumbai City (2022–23) 
Fewest points in a season: 5, NorthEast United (2022–23)
Fewest home points in a season: 4, NorthEast United (2022–23)  
Fewest away points in a season: 1, NorthEast United (2022–23)   
Fewest points in a season while winning the league: 39, Goa (2019–20)

Wins 
Most wins in total: 74, Mumbai City 
Most wins in a season: 14, Mumbai City (2022–23)
Most home wins in a season: 8, ATK Mohun Bagan (2020–21)
Most away wins in a season: 8, Mumbai City (2022–23)
Fewest wins in a season: 1
East Bengal (2021–22)
NorthEast United (2022–23)
Fewest home wins in a season: 0 
Chennaiyin (2020–21) 
East Bengal (2021–22)
Fewest away wins in a season: 0
Mumbai City (2014)
Pune City (2015)
NorthEast United (2021–22)
NorthEast United (2022–23)
Most consecutive wins: 11, Mumbai City (9 October 2022 – 27 January 2023)  
Most consecutive matches without a win: 14
Kerala Blasters (5 October 2018 – 6 February 2019)
Hyderabad (6 November 2019 – 13 February 2020)
NorthEast United (27 November 2019 – 25 February 2020)

Defeats 
Most defeats in total: 74, NorthEast United
Most defeats in a season: 16, NorthEast United (2022–23)
Most home defeats in a season: 8, NorthEast United (2022–23)
Most away defeats in a season: 8 
Hyderabad (2019–20) 
NorthEast United (2022–23)
Fewest defeats in a season: 2
Atlético de Kolkata (2016)
Mumbai City (2022–23)
Fewest home defeats in a season: 0
Delhi Dynamos (2016)
Bengaluru (2018–19)
Fewest away defeats in a season: 1
Atlético de Kolkata (2016)
Mumbai City (2016)
Pune City (2017–18) 
Goa (2020–21) 
Hyderabad (2020–21), (2021–22)
NorthEast United (2020–21)
ATK Mohun Bagan (2021–22)
Mumbai City (2022–23)
Most consecutive matches undefeated: 18, Mumbai City (9 October 2022 – 11 February 2023) 
Most consecutive defeats: 10, NorthEast United (8 October – 17 December 2022)

Draws 
Most draws in total: 54, Kerala Blasters
Most draws in a season: 11
Hyderabad (2020–21)
Chennaiyin (2020–21)
Most home draws in a season: 7, Chennaiyin (2020–21)  
Most away draws in a season: 6 
Jamshedpur (2018–19)
Hyderabad (2020–21)
NorthEast United (2020–21)
Fewest draws in a season: 1
Chennaiyin (2015)
Bengaluru (2017–18, 2022–23)
East Bengal (2022–23)
Kerala Blasters (2022–23)
Fewest home draws in a season: 0
Chennaiyin (2015)
Atlético de Kolkata (2015)
NorthEast United (2016) 
Pune City (2017–18) 
Mumbai City (2017–18)
ATK Mohun Bagan (2022–23)
Bengaluru (2022–23)
Goa (2022–23)
Kerala Blasters (2022–23)
Fewest away draws in a season: 0
Delhi Dynamos (2015)
Bengaluru (2017–18)
Hyderabad (2019–20)
East Bengal (2022–23)
Most consecutive draws: 6, Goa (17 January – 13 February 2021)

Goals 
Most goals scored in a season: 54, Mumbai City (2022–23)
Fewest goals scored in a season: 11, NorthEast United (2014)
Most goals conceded in a season: 51, NorthEast United (2022–23) 
Fewest goals conceded in a season: 11, Mumbai City (2016)
Best goal difference in a season: 33, Mumbai City (2022–23)
Worst goal difference in a season: –34, NorthEast United (2022–23)
Most goals scored at home in a season: 25, Goa (2018–19)
Fewest goals scored at home in a season: 4, Kerala Blasters (2014)
Most goals conceded at home in a season: 28, NorthEast United (2022–23)
Fewest goals conceded at home in a season: 2, Kerala Blasters (2014)
Most goals scored away in a season: 30, Mumbai City (2022–23)
Fewest goals scored away in a season: 3, Mumbai City (2014)
Most goals conceded away in a season: 27, NorthEast United (2022–23)
Fewest goals conceded away in a season: 5, Mumbai City (2016)
Most consecutive matches without scoring: 7, Chennaiyin (15 February – 10 November 2019)
Most goals scored in total: 302, Goa
Most goals conceded in total: 272, Odisha

Disciplinary 
Most yellow cards in total: 341, Mumbai City
Most red cards in total: 20, Goa
Most yellow cards in a season: 61, Mumbai City (2020–21)
Fewest yellow cards in a season: 17, Kerala Blasters (2014)
Most red cards in a season: 4
Goa (2016, 2019–20, 2020–21) 
Atlético de Kolkata (2016) 
Delhi Dynamos (2017–18)
Chennaiyin (2019–20)
East Bengal (2020–21)
Jamshedpur (2020–21)

Awards 
Most Golden Boot Winners: 3
Chennaiyin (2014, 2015, 2019–20)
Goa (2017–18, 2018–19, 2020–21)
Most Hero of the League: 2, Goa (2018–19, 2019–20)
Most Golden Glove Winners: 2, Bengaluru (2018–19, 2019–20)
Most Emerging Player of the League Winners: 3, Kerala Blasters (2014, 2017–18, 2018–19)
Most Winning Pass of the League Winners: 2, Goa (2019–20, 2020–21)

Attendances 
Highest attendance, single match: 68,340, Atlético de Kolkata 2–1  Chennaiyin (at Vivekananda Yuba Bharati Krirangan, 16 December 2015)
Lowest attendance, single match: 361, NorthEast United 2–2 Goa (at Indira Gandhi Athletic Stadium, 15 January 2023)
Highest season average attendance: 52,008 – Jawaharlal Nehru Stadium (Kochi), Kerala Blasters (2016)
Lowest season average attendance: 2,457 – Indira Gandhi Athletic Stadium, NorthEast United (2022–23)

Player records

Appearances 
Most Indian Super League appearances: 143, Pritam Kotal (from 18 October 2014)
Appearance for different clubs: 6
Subhashish Roy Chowdhury (ATK, Delhi Dynamos, Goa, Kerala Blasters, Jamshedpur and NorthEast United)
Arindam Bhattacharya (Pune City, Mumbai City, ATK, ATK Mohun Bagan, East Bengal, NorthEast United)   
Oldest player: David James, 44 years and 141 days (for Kerala Blasters v. Atlético de Kolkata, 20 December 2014)
Youngest player: Alfred Lalroutsang, 16 years and 239 days (for NorthEast United v. Hyderabad, 20 February 2020)

Bold denotes players still playing in the Indian Super League.Italics denotes players still playing professional football.

Goals 

First Indian Super League goal: Fikru Teferra (for Atlético de Kolkata v. Mumbai City, 12 October 2014)
Most Indian Super League goals: 63, Bartholomew Ogbeche
Most Indian Super League goals at one club: 48, Coro (for Goa)
Oldest goalscorer: 41 years and 15 days, Robert Pires (for Goa v. Delhi Dynamos, 13 November 2014)
Youngest goalscorer: 18 years and 43 days, Komal Thatal (for ATK v. Bengaluru, 31 October 2018)

Bold denotes players still playing in the Indian Super League.Italics denotes players still playing professional football.

Fastest goal: 12 seconds, David Williams (for ATK Mohun Bagan v. Hyderabad, 5 January 2022)
Longest goal: 59 meters, Álvaro Vázquez (for Kerala Blasters v. NorthEast United, 4 February 2022)
Most goals in a game: 4, Modou Sougou (for Mumbai City v. Kerala Blasters, 16 December 2018) W 6–1
Most hat-tricks: 4, Bartholomew Ogbeche (for NorthEast United, Kerala Blasters and Hyderabad)
Oldest player to score an Indian Super League hat-trick: 37 years and 184 days, Diego Forlán (for Mumbai City v. Kerala Blasters, 19 November 2016)
Youngest player to score an Indian Super League hat-trick: 21 years and 73 days, Kiyan Nassiri (for ATK Mohun Bagan v. East Bengal, 29 January 2022)
Fastest hat-trick: 7 minutes, Coro (for Goa v. Kerala Blasters, 9 December 2017)

Assists 

Bold denotes players still playing in the Indian Super League

Most Indian Super League assists in a season: 10
Hugo Boumous (Goa, 2019–20)
Greg Stewart (Jamshedpur, 2021–22)

Goalkeepers 

Bold denotes players still playing in the Indian Super League

Most Indian Super League clean sheets in a season: 12, Vishal Kaith (ATK Mohun Bagan, 2022–23)

Disciplinary 
Most yellow cards for a player: 37, Harmanjot Singh Khabra
Most red cards for a player: 4, Ahmed Jahouh
Most fouls: 244, Ahmed Jahouh

Awards 
Most Indian Super League Golden Boot: 2
Coro (2017–18, 2018–19) 
Most Indian Super League Golden Glove: 2
Gurpreet Singh Sandhu (2018–19, 2019–20)

Match records

Scorelines 
Biggest home win: 7–0, Goa v. Mumbai City (17 November 2015)
Biggest away win:
5–0, Goa v. Jamshedpur (19 February 2020)
6–1, Mumbai City v. Odisha (24 February 2021)
5–0, Hyderabad v. NorthEast United (31 January 2022)
5–0, Goa v. Chennaiyin (9 February 2022)
6–1, Hyderabad v. NorthEast United (29 December 2022)
Biggest aggregate win: 10–1 
5–1, Hyderabad v. NorthEast United (13 December 2021) and 0–5, NorthEast United v. Hyderabad (31 January 2022)
Highest scoring: 6–5, Odisha v. East Bengal (27 February 2021)
Highest scoring draw: 
4–4, Odisha v. Kerala Blasters (23 February 2020)
4–4, Goa v. Kerala Blasters (6 March 2022)

Coaches 
Most Championships: 2, Antonio Lopez Habas (Atlético de Kolkata, ATK Mohun Bagan) – 2014, 2019–20
Most League Winners Shield: 2, Sergio Lobera (Goa, Mumbai City) – 2019–20, 2020–21
Most clubs managed: 3, Steve Coppell (Kerala Blasters, Jamshedpur, ATK)
Most games as a coach: 97 games, Antonio Lopez Habas (ATK 54, ATK Mohun Bagan 29, Pune City 14)
Longest spell as a coach: 58 games, Manolo Márquez (Hyderabad, 23 November 2020 – present) 
Shortest spell as a coach (excluding caretakers): 3 games, Miguel Ángel Portugal (Pune City, 3 – 22 October 2018)
Oldest coach: Stuart Baxter,  (for Odisha v. Jamshedpur, 1 February 2021)
Youngest coach: Gerard Nus,  (for NorthEast United v. Mumbai City, 21 November 2020) 
Most wins in total: 44, Antonio Lopez Habas (ATK 25, ATK Mohun Bagan 15, Pune City 4)
Most defeats in total: 27, Antonio Lopez Habas (ATK 14, ATK Mohun Bagan 7, Pune City 6) 
Most consecutive matches undefeated: 16, Des Buckingham (Mumbai City), 9 October 2022 – 27 January 2023
Most consecutive wins: 11, Des Buckingham (Mumbai City), 9 October 2022 – 27 January 2023
Most consecutive defeats: 8, Marco Balbul (NorthEast United), 8 October – 2 December 2022
Most consecutive matches without a win: 11
Robert Jarni (NorthEast United), 27 November 2019 – 10 February 2020  
Phil Brown (Hyderabad), 6 November 2019 – 24 January 2020

All-time Indian Super League table 
The all-time Indian Super League table is a cumulative record of all match results, points and goals of every team that has played in the Indian Super League since its inception in 2013. The table that follows is accurate as of the end of the 2022–23 season. Teams in bold were part of the 2022–23 Indian Super League. Numbers in bold are the record (highest either positive or negative) numbers in each column. Playoff matches taken into account.

Status in 2022–23:

See also
 List of Indian football champions
 List of Indian football first tier top scorers
 List of foreign Indian Super League players 
 List of Indian Super League seasons 
 List of Indian Super League owners 
 List of Indian Super League head coaches 
 Indian Super League attendance 
 List of Indian Super League hat-tricks

Notes

References

External links
 ISL at WorldFootball.net
 ISL at Soccerway

Records and statistics
I
Super League